Frost & Fire is a 288-page collection of short stories and essays by Roger Zelazny.  It was printed in 1989 by William Morrow.

Contents
"An Exorcism, of Sorts" 
"Permafrost" 
"LOKI 7281" 
"Dreadsong" 
"Itself Surprised" - a story set in the Berserker shared universe.
"Dayblood" 
"Constructing A Science Fiction Novel" 
"The Bands of Titan" 
"Mana from Heaven" - a story set in Larry Niven's Warlock universe, updated to modern times.
"Night Kings", first published in Worlds of If, September-November 1986
"Quest's End" 
"24 Views of Mt. Fuji, by Hokusai" 
"Fantasy and Science Fiction: A Writer's View"

References

1989 short story collections
Short story collections by Roger Zelazny
Fantasy short story collections
Science fiction short story collections
Essay collections